There have been several Catalan independence referendums for determining the independence of Catalonia from Spain.

 2017 Catalan independence referendum
 Declaration of the Initiation of the Process of Independence of Catalonia
 Law on the Referendum on Self-determination of Catalonia
 2014 Catalan self-determination referendum
 Catalan independence referendums, 2009–11
 Catalan independence referendum, 2009 (Arenys de Munt)

See also
 2012 Catalan independence demonstration
 Catalan independence
 Catalan Republic

Referendums
Independence referendums
Catalonia referendum
Catalonia
Catalonia independence
Independence